Kjell Erik Espmark (19 February 1930 – 18 September 2022) was a Swedish writer, literary historian, member of the Swedish Academy, and Professor of the History of Literature at Stockholm University. He was elected to the Swedish Academy on 5 March 1981 and admitted on 20 December 1981. Kjell Espmark succeeded the linguist Elias Wessén to Seat No.16. On 6 April 2018 Espmark announced that he would no longer participate in the work of the Academy, but returned to his seat in January 2019.

Bibliography

 Mordet på Benjamin (1956)
 Världen genom kameraögat (1958)
 Mikrokosmos (1961)
 Livsdyrkaren Artur Lundkvist : studier i hans lyrik till och med Vit man (1964)
 Det offentliga samtalet (1968)
 Harry Martinson erövrar sitt språk : en studie i hans lyriska metod 1927-1934 (1970)
 Samtal under jorden (1972)
 Det obevekliga paradiset (1975)
 Att översätta själen : en huvudlinje i modern poesi – från Baudelaire till surrealismen (1975)
 Sent i Sverige (1976)
 Själen i  : en huvudlinje i modern svensk poesi (1977)
 Försök till liv (1979)
 Elias Wessén : inträdestal i Svenska akademien (1981)
 Tecken till Europa (1982)
 Resans formler: en studie i Tomas Tranströmers poesi (1983)
 Den hemliga måltiden (1984)
  (1985)
 Glömskan (1987)
 Missförståndet (1989)
 Föraktet (1991)
 När vägen vänder (1992)
 Lojaliteten (1993)
 Hatet (1995)
 Revanschen (1996)
 Glädjen (1997)
 Det andra livet (1998)
 Glömskans tid (1999)
 De levande har inga gravar (2002)
 Utanför kalendern (2003)
 Béla Bartók mot Tredje riket (2004)
 Harry Martinson – mästaren (2005)
 Motvilliga historier (2006)
 Vintergata (2007)
 Albatrossen på däcket (2008)
 Det enda nödvändiga : dikter 1956-2009 (2010)
 Marx i London och andra pjäser (2011)
 Lend Me Your Voice (2011), poetry, English translation by Robin Fulton
 I vargtimmen (2012)
 Outside the Calendar (2012), poetry, English translation by Robin Fulton
 Hoffmanns försvar (2013)
 Den inre rymden (2014)
 Resan till Thule (2017)
 Kvällens frihet (2019)
 Återliv (2021)

References

Notes

Sources

1930 births
2022 deaths
Swedish literary scholars
Members of the Swedish Academy
Academic staff of Stockholm University
People from Strömsund Municipality